Rosepine High School is a public high school serving Rosepine, Louisiana, United States. It is part of the Vernon Parish School Board.

Rosepine Jr/Sr High School, along with all public schools in the state, receives a letter grade that reflects the school's performance. Since the 2011-2012 school year, Rosepine has achieved and maintained an "A" grade.

Athletics
Rosepine High athletics competes in the LHSAA.

Awards and recognition
In 2014, Rosepine was recognized as a  Blue Ribbon school by Betsy DeVos.

References

Educational institutions in the United States with year of establishment missing
Public high schools in Louisiana
Schools in Vernon Parish, Louisiana
Public middle schools in Louisiana